The following is a list of the 150 municipalities (comuni) of the Province of Cosenza, Calabria, Italy.

List

See also
List of municipalities of Italy

References

Cosenza